"Don't Want to Know If You Are Lonely" is a song by Hüsker Dü from their album Candy Apple Grey. The song was written by Grant Hart. It was released both as an EP in the United States and as a single in the United Kingdom in March 1986. Hüsker Dü filmed a promotional video for the song, which garnered the band some play on MTV. The song, dubbed a "tuneful blast of Buzzcocks-style pop-punk," was labeled the high point of Grey by AllMusic's Stewart Mason.

The song is featured in the 2009 comedy-drama movie, Adventureland.

Track listing

EP track listing
Side One
"Don't Want to Know If You Are Lonely" (Hart)

Side Two
"All Work and No Play" (Long Mix) (Mould)
"Helter Skelter" (Lennon-McCartney)

"Helter Skelter" was recorded live on January 30, 1985 at First Avenue in Minneapolis, Minnesota.

UK single track listing
Side One
"Don't Want to Know If You Are Lonely" (Hart)
Side Two
"All Work and No Play" (Mould)

Side by Side: Record Store Day 2011

On Record Store Day, 2011, Warner Bros. Records released an exclusive limited edition print of a "Don't Want to Know If You Are Lonely" split single. The split single features the original version of "Don't Want to Know If You Are Lonely" performed by Hüsker Dü on one side, and a cover version by the band Green Day on the other. The Green Day version had previously appeared on the single for their song, Warning.

Side A
 "Don't Want to Know If You Are Lonely" (as performed by Hüsker Dü)
Side B
 "Don't Wanna Know If You Are Lonely" (as performed by Green Day)

Cover versions
"Don't Want to Know If You Are Lonely" has been covered by several different artists, including Green Day, who recorded it for an MTV show titled "Influences". The UK band Catherine Wheel recorded a version of the song on their 1992 "30th Century Man" EP. Also in 1992, Mega City Four covered it on their LP "Inspiringly Titled: The Live Album" and its advance EP "Shivering Sand - Live". The Swedish rockband Fireside has also recorded a version of the song on the "Hello kids" album. In 2013, Il Cattivo, a Denver-based heavy rock band released a guitar dueling rendition on their second record How To Assess Your Damages. The song was also covered by Australian musician Paul Dempsey.
Another notable cover version has been made by the German-based band The Richies in 1993.

References

1986 singles
1986 EPs
Hüsker Dü songs
Songs written by Bob Mould
Songs written by Grant Hart
American pop punk songs